The Big Bulls are a set of seven large statues of bulls that decorate the city of Rockhampton, Queensland, Australia. The set is regarded as one of Australia's big things and is intended to reinforce Rockhampton's claim to being the Beef Capital of Australia.  Initially there were two bull statues but over time others were added reaching a total of seven. Five of the bulls were created by sculptor Hugh Anderson.

The theft of the testicles from the bulls is a common prank and they frequently have to be replaced.  Some residents also feel that the bull statues over-emphasise one aspect of the city and should be relocated to less prominent locations. However, there is strong public support for the retention of the bulls.

Locations 

The first six bull statues are located near highways and major roads and were built to be realistic depictions of breeds of cattle raised in the area; the seventh was constructed as an art work for display at the Rockhampton Art Gallery. The bull statues are:

Other bulls 

Within Rockhampton, there are other bull statues, including:

 Stockman's Corner clothing store, 9 Gladstone Road, Allenstown.  A white bull is raised above the store awning;
 'Lease-A-Bull', 184 Musgrave Street, Berserker.  A braford bull, on top of a building awning; and
 Korte's Resort, 984 Yaamba Road, Parkhurst.  The entrance to the motel has three beige bulls together.

Proposed bulls 
In 2021, the Belmont Red Breed Society bemoaned the fact their breed was not yet represented in the series of statues despite it having been developed at the Belmont Research Station near Rockhampton. President of the Belmont Red Breed Society, Jeanne Seifert said a statue of a Belmont Red bull would not only be a good focal point for visitors to the city but also a tribute to the contribution which had been made by scientists and the CSIRO. Her father, Dr George Seifert, was a principal research scientist based at the Belmont Research Station, credited with helping develop the composition of the breed.

References

Big things in Queensland
Buildings and structures in Rockhampton
Statues in Australia
Cattle in art
Sculptures of bovines